Jordan Sandke is an American jazz trumpeter, cornetist, and fluegelhornist.

Biography
Sandke was born around 1946. His main area of musical interest is the swing era. He and his brother, Randy Sandke, played in the Widespread Depression Jazz Orchestra. His recording debut as sole leader was Rhythm Is Our Business, for Stash Records in 1985. He played both trumpet and cornet on the album, which also featured Tad Shull (tenor sax), Jaki Byard (piano), Milt Hinton (bass), and Charlie Braugham (drums).

Playing style
A 1988 reviewer commented that "Sandke, using both trumpet and fluegelhorn, is rich-toned and mellow at one moment or crisply biting at another." With the Widespread Depression Orchestra, he played "gloriously growling full-bodied Cootie Williams solos".

Discography

As leader/co-leader
Rhythm Is Our Business (Stash, 1985)

As sideman
With Widespread Depression Orchestra
 Downtown Uproar (Stash, 1979)
 Boogie in the Barnyard (Stash, 1980)
 Rockin' in Rhythm (Phontastic, 1980)
 Time to Jump and Shout (Stash, 1981)

With Widespread Jazz Orchestra
 Swing Is the Thing (Adelphi, 1982)
 Paris Blues (Columbia, 1984)

References

Living people
American jazz trumpeters
American male trumpeters
21st-century trumpeters
21st-century American male musicians
American male jazz musicians
Year of birth missing (living people)
Widespread Depression Jazz Orchestra members